Sandy Farina is an American singer-songwriter and actress, best known for her role in the film Sgt. Pepper's Lonely Hearts Club Band. She also wrote the song "Kiss Me in the Rain" for Barbra Streisand (which appeared on Streisand's album Wet). She was a Star Search contestant in 1985, and the following year was co-lead vocalist on the "Hands Across America" charity single.

She is currently a session singer for television commercials.

Filmography 
 1978 : Sergeant Pepper's Lonely Hearts Club Band - Plays Strawberry Fields and sings : Here Comes The Sun, Strawberry Fields Forever, When I'm 64 & Sgt. Pepper's Lonely Hearts Club Band (Finale).
 1984 : Toxic (The Toxic Avenger) - Performs Body Talk
 1987 : Electric Blue - Performs The Pride Is Back

Discography  
Album :
 1980 : All Alone In The Night

Singles :
 1980 : All Alone In The Night/All Alone In The Night
 1984 : Temptation/Fly Boy Fly

Writer :
 1979 : Kiss Me in the Rain Barbra Streisand's album Wet - Words: Sandy Farina Music: Lisa Ratner. 
 1979 : Kiss Me In the Rain" / "I Ain't Gonna Cry Tonight

References 
 https://www.imdb.com/name/nm0267471/
 https://www.discogs.com/fr/artist/336323-Sandy-Farina
 https://www.discogs.com/fr/Barbra-Streisand-Wet/release/6203501

External links
 Official webpage

Living people
American women singer-songwriters
Year of birth missing (living people)
21st-century American women